Epipristis is a genus of moths in the family Geometridae erected by Edward Meyrick in 1888.

Species
Epipristis minimaria (Guenée, [1858]) (=Hypochroma parvula Walker, 1860)
Epipristis nelearia (Guenée, [1858])
Epipristis nelearia nelearia (Guenée, [1858])
Epipristis nelearia accessa Prout, 1937
Epipristis oxycyma Meyrick, 1888 (=Epipristis australis Goldfinch, 1929)
Epipristis oxyodonta Prout, 1934
Epipristis pullusa H.X. Han & D.Y. Xue, 2009
Epipristis roseus Expósito & H.X. Han, 2009
Epipristis rufilunata (Warren, 1903)
Epipristis rufilunata rufilunata (Warren, 1903) (=Epipristis nelearia viridans Prout, 1916)
Epipristis rufilunata antelucana Prout, 1927
Epipristis storthophora Prout, 1937
Epipristis transiens (Sterneck, 1927)
Epipristis truncataria (Walker, 1861)

References

 ; ;  2009: A taxonomic study of Epipristis Meyrick, 1888 from China, with descriptions of two new species (Lepidoptera: Geometridae, Geometrinae). Zootaxa, 2263: 31–41. Abstract & excerpt PDF

External links

Pseudoterpnini
Geometridae genera